Center Township is an inactive township in Knox County, in the U.S. state of Missouri.

Center Township most likely derives its name from "Centerville", an old variant name of Colony, Missouri.

References

Townships in Missouri
Townships in Knox County, Missouri